Alder Moors is a   Local Nature Reserve in Woodley, a suburb of Reading in Berkshire. It is owned and managed by Wokingham District Council.

The name 'Aldermoors' derives from the alder trees that populate this reserve. It is ancient woodland with coppiced areas.

History
In 1990 the site was declared as a local nature reserve by Wokingham Borough Council.

Fauna
The site has the following fauna:

Mammals
Common shrew
European rabbit
Red fox

Invertebrates
Green-veined white
Holly blue
Aglais io
Polygonia c-album
Speckled wood
Hornet moth
Kidney Spot ladybird
Stigmella aurella
Holly leaf miner

Birds
Mallard
Canada goose
Red kite
Eurasian sparrowhawk
Common buzzard
Common chiffchaff
Eurasian blackcap
Eurasian wren
Anser anser
Ardea cinerea
Certhia familiaris
Cygnus olor
Common chaffinch
Coot

Amphibians & reptiles
Common frog
Grass snake

Flora
The site has the following flora:

Trees
Acer campestre
Acer pseudoplatanus
Alnus glutinosa
Corylus avellana
Crataegus monogyna
Fraxinus excelsior
Ilex aquifolium
Prunus avium
Prunus cerasifera
Prunus spinosa
Quercus robur
Sambucus nigra
Taxus baccata
Ulmus procera
Taxus baccata

Plants

Mosses & Liverworts
Hypnum cupressiforme
Orthotrichum affine
Polytrichastrum formosum
Pellia epiphylla

Lichens
Flavoparmelia caperata
Lecanora chlarotera
Lecidella elaeochroma
Lepraria incana
Parmelia sulcata
Parmotrema perlatum
Phaeophyscia orbicularis
Physcia adscendens
Physcia tenella
Ramalina farinacea
Xanthoria parietina

Fungi
Phragmidium violaceum

References

Local Nature Reserves in Berkshire